The 2017 Queensland Cup season was the 22nd season of Queensland's top-level statewide rugby league competition run by the Queensland Rugby League. The competition, known as the Intrust Super Cup due to sponsorship from Intrust Super, featured 14 teams playing a 29-week long season (including finals) from March to September.

The Papua New Guinea Hunters won their first premiership after defeating the Sunshine Coast Falcons 12–10 in the Grand Final at Suncorp Stadium, becoming the first team from outside of Australia to win the Queensland Cup. Hunters'  Ase Boas was named the competition's Player of the Year, winning the Courier Mail Medal.

Teams
In 2017, the lineup of teams remained unchanged for the third consecutive year.

Ladder

Final series

Grand Final

The PNG Hunters won their first minor premiership after finishing ahead of Redcliffe by a single point. After earning a bye in the first week of the finals, they defeated Redcliffe in the major semi final to qualify for their first Grand Final. Sunshine Coast had to earn their Grand Final spot the hard way, winning four straight games on route to the decider. In the first week, they eliminated Souths Logan and then upset the third-placed Easts Tigers in the semi finals and the second-placed Dolphins in the preliminary final to qualify for their second Grand Final.

First half
The Sunshine Coast stunned the Hunters early in the first half, with winger Matt Soper-Lawler scoring in just the 2nd minute as the Falcons hunted another finals upset. Five minutes later they scored their second try when second rower Joe Stimson crossed in the 7th minute. That would be the end of the first half scoring, with the Hunters getting close to getting their first try in the 15th minute but were ruled back for a forward pass.

Second half
It took the Hunters just two minutes to record their first points of the game when halfback Watson Boas scored after a deflected kick and an error from the Falcons. The scoreline remained unchanged for the next 36 minutes as neither side could crack the others defence. Finally, in the 79th minute, Hunters' forward Willie Minoga became his side's hero, as he dived onto an Ase Boas' grubber to score the try that levelled the scores. After consulting with the video referee, the try was awarded and Ase Boas kicked the game-winning conversion from right in front to give the Hunters their first ever Queensland Cup premiership. Hunters' captain Ase Boas was awarded the Duncan Hall Medal for man of the match.

NRL State Championship

After winning the Grand Final, the PNG Hunters qualified for the NRL State Championship on NRL Grand Final day. They were defeated by the Penrith Panthers, the New South Wales Cup premiers, 18–42.

Player statistics
The following statistics are as of the conclusion of the season (including finals).

Leading try scorers

Leading point scorers

QRL awards
 Courier Mail Medal (Best and Fairest): Ase Boas ( PNG Hunters)
 Coach of the Year: Michael Marum ( Redcliffe Dolphins)
 Rookie of the Year: Brandon Smith ( Sunshine Coast Falcons)
 Representative Player of the Year: Nick Slyney ( Queensland Residents,  Redcliffe Dolphins)
 XXXX People's Choice Award: Ase Boas ( PNG Hunters)

Team of the Year

See also

 Queensland Cup
 Queensland Rugby League

References

2017 in Australian rugby league
Queensland Cup